Amir Aghaei (born August 1, 1975) is an Iranian actor and author.

Career
Aghaei made his cinematic debut by performing in Ebrahim Hatami-Kia's ‘Low Heights’ (2001).

Among his movies are ‘The Second Woman’ (2007), ‘Elixir and Dust’ (2008), ‘Hell, Purgatory, Heaven’ (2008), ‘Death is My Trade’ (2010), ‘Sa'adat Abad’ (2010), ‘Hush! Girls Don't Scream’ (2012), ‘Wednesday, 9 May’ (2014) and ‘Mermaid’ (2015). 

Aghaei has also performed in a number of series including ‘The Gift of Darkness’ (2010), ‘The First Night of Peace’ (2005), ‘The Innocents’ (2008), ‘The Red Soil’ (2000) and ‘Remembrance’ (2013).
He is also interested in painting, photography and poetry. He has exhibited his works in a number of galleries and published a book of poetry titled 'Willows in the Wind' (2010).

Filmography

Film

Web

Ferris wheel (2016)
The Recall (TV series) (2011)
Lotus (2008)
The day arises (2006)
The passed way (2005)

References

External links
 
 Amir Aghaei in Internet database of Soureh Cinema
 Amir Aghaei on Film2irani
 

1975 births
Living people
People from Urmia
People from Tehran
Iranian male writers
Iranian male film actors
Iranian male stage actors
Iranian male television actors
21st-century Iranian male actors
Crystal Simorgh for Best Supporting Actor winners